In mathematics, the Goormaghtigh conjecture is a conjecture in number theory named for the Belgian mathematician René Goormaghtigh. The conjecture is that the only non-trivial integer solutions of the exponential Diophantine equation

and

Partial results

For fixed x (or y), equation has at most 15 solutions, and at most two unless x is either odd prime power times a power of two, or in the finite set {15, 21, 30, 33, 35, 39, 45, 51, 65, 85, 143, 154, 713}, in which case there are at most three solutions. Furthermore, there is at most one solution if the odd part of n is squareful unless n has at most two distinct odd prime factors or n is in a finite set {315, 495, 525, 585, 630, 693, 735, 765, 855, 945, 1035, 1050, 1170, 1260, 1386, 1530, 1890, 1925, 1950, 1953, 2115, 2175, 2223, 2325, 2535, 2565, 2898, 2907, 3105, 3150, 3325, 3465, 3663, 3675, 4235, 5525, 5661, 6273, 8109, 17575, 39151}.

Application to repunits
The Goormaghtigh conjecture may be expressed as saying that 31 (111 in base 5, 11111 in base 2) and 8191 (111 in base 90, 1111111111111 in base 2) are the only two numbers that are repunits with at least 3 digits in two different bases.

See also
Feit–Thompson conjecture

References
 Goormaghtigh, Rene. L’Intermédiaire des Mathématiciens 24 (1917), 88
 
 
 
 
 
 
 
 

Diophantine equations
Conjectures
Unsolved problems in number theory